Kick It Out may refer to:

"Kick It Out" (Boom Boom Satellites song)
"Kick It Out" (Heart song)
Kick It Out (organisation), an association football anti-racism campaign